
St. Albans School may refer to:

Australia
 St Albans Secondary College, a 7-12 secondary school located at St Albans, Victoria, Australia

South Africa
 St. Alban's College, a private boarding and day school for boys in Lynnwood Glen, Pretoria, Gauteng, South Africa

United Kingdom
 St Alban's Catholic High School, Ipswich, a secondary school and sixth form with academy status located in Ipswich, Suffolk
 St Alban's Roman Catholic High School, Pontypool, a Roman Catholic secondary school in Pontypool, Torfaen, Wales

St Albans, Hertfordshire
 St Albans Girls' School, a girls secondary school
 St Albans High School for Girls, a selective, independent day school for girls aged 4–18 years
 St Albans School, Hertfordshire, an independent school

United States
 Saint Albans High School (West Virginia), a public high school in Kanawha County
 St. Albans School (Washington, D.C.), an independent college preparatory day and boarding school for boys in grades 4–12